Druide informatique is a Canadian-based technology company best known for developing and publishing Antidote, a writing assistance software suite for French and English.

The company was established in 1993, and released the first version of its main product in 1996.

Druide informatique also publishes other software such as Typing Pal, a program to teach keyboard users to type faster. Its subsidiary Éditions Druide publishes fiction and nonfiction books in French.

Companies based in Montreal